Ceratocentron is a critically endangered monotypic genus of plants in the family Orchidaceae. It sole known species, Ceratocentron fesselii, is found at high altitudes from Nueva Vizcaya and Nueva Ecija to the Cordillera Mountain ranges on Luzon island in the Philippines. The holotype was discovered in northern Nueva Ecija. The species is rare in the wild, and remained unknown to science until 1989.

It is critically endangered due to habitat degradation and collecting. According to the IUCN, over-collecting to keep up with demand in the international orchid trade has led to its decline.

References

  (Eds) (2014) Genera Orchidacearum Volume 6: Epidendroideae (Part 3); page 148 ff., Oxford: Oxford University Press.

External links
IOSPE orchid photos
Black Jungle Terrarium Supply (Turners Falls Massachusetts USA), Ceratocentron fesselii
ARKive
The Beauty of Orchids & Flowers, Ceratocentron fesselii Senghas 1989
Martine's Orchids Garden, Ceratocentron fesselii 

Monotypic Epidendroideae genera
Vandeae genera
Aeridinae
Endemic orchids of the Philippines
Flora of Luzon
Endangered plants
Species endangered by the pet trade
Species endangered by logging
Species endangered by slash-and-burn
Species endangered by urbanization
Taxonomy articles created by Polbot